Václav Vydra mey refer to:

 Václav Vydra (actor, born 1876) (1876–1953), Czech film and stage actor
 Václav Vydra (actor, born 1956), Czech theater, television and film actor